Sidi Mohamed Ould Bidjel (born 1 January 1982), is a Mauritanian athlete.

Bidjel competed in the 1500 metres at the 2000 Summer Olympics, he finished 14th in his heat so didn't qualify for the next round.

References

1982 births
Living people
Olympic athletes of Mauritania
Mauritanian male middle-distance runners
Athletes (track and field) at the 2000 Summer Olympics